The South Halmahera languages are the branch of Austronesian languages found along the southeast coast of the island of Halmahera in the Indonesian province of North Maluku. Irarutu is spoken in the east of the Bomberai Peninsula in West Papua province.

Most of the languages are only known from short word lists, but Taba and Buli are fairly well attested.

They are not related to the North Halmahera languages, which are notable for being non-Austronesian. However, Ternatan influence is considerable, a legacy of the historical dominance of the Ternate Sultanate.

Classification
The South Halmahera languages are listed below according to Glottolog 4.0's classification, with alternate names and dialects listed from Kamholz (2014: 17):

East Makian – Gane
Gane (Gimán; dialect: Saketa)
Taba (East Makian, Makian Dalam; dialects: Kayoa, Southeast Makian)
Buli languages
Buli (dialect: Wayamli)
Maba (Bicoli)
Patani
Sawai (Weda)
Gebe (dialect: Minyaifuin)

References

South Halmahera–West New Guinea languages
Languages of the Maluku Islands
Languages of western New Guinea
Halmahera